Pierre E. Belliveau (May 18, 1896 – September 20, 1966) was a physician and political figure in Nova Scotia, Canada. He represented Clare in the Nova Scotia House of Assembly from 1953 to 1963 as a Liberal member.

He was born in Belliveau's Cove, Nova Scotia, the son of Isaie Beliveau and Alix Lombard. Belliveau was educated at the Collège Sainte-Anne and Dalhousie University. In 1924, he married Angèle Robichaud. He served as a director for Le petit Courrier du Sud-Ouest de la Nouvelle-Écosse, later Le Courrier de la Nouvelle-Écosse, at the time a small newssheet aimed at the local Acadian community. Belliveau died at Yarmouth on September 20, 1966.

References 
 Canadian Parliamentary Guide, 1956, PG Normandin

1896 births
1966 deaths
Nova Scotia Liberal Party MLAs
Acadian people